Eric Saindon (born December 5, 1970) is an American visual effects supervisor for movies, including Avatar: The Way of Water, The Green Knight, Pete's Dragon, The Hobbit trilogy (2012–2014), Avatar, Alita: Battle Angel, Night at the Museum, X-Men: The Last Stand and worked on others such as, King Kong, I, Robot, The Lord of the Rings: The Return of the King, The Lord of the Rings: The Two Towers, The Lord of the Rings: The Fellowship of the Ring. Over 10 Academy Awards have been given to movies he has been a part of, with 2 Oscar and 3 BAFTA nominations himself. He lives in Wellington, New Zealand.

Awards

Academy Award and BAFTA nominations
The Hobbit: The Battle of the Five Armies
The Hobbit: The Desolation of Smaug
The Hobbit: An Unexpected Journey

Visual Effects Society Awards
Avatar
King Kong
The Lord of the Rings: The Return of the King
The Lord of the Rings: The Two Towers

External links

The Lord of the Rings
MCN Awards

Special effects people
American emigrants to New Zealand
Best Visual Effects BAFTA Award winners
Living people
Year of birth missing (living people)
Best Visual Effects Academy Award winners